Brignall Banks  is a Site of Special Scientific Interest in the Teesdale district of south-west County Durham, England. 
It consists of a narrow belt of woodland on the steep slopes of the valleys of the River Greta 
and its tributary, Gill Beck, just west of  Brignall village and about 6 km south of Barnard Castle.

It is one of the largest expanses of semi-natural woodland in North-east England; a number of scarce species are present, 
indicating that it is ancient woodland.

A varied lichen flora includes several species that are sensitive to air pollution and rare in County Durham, 
including some, such as  Thelotrema lepadinum and Graphis scripta, 
that are indicator species for ancient woodland.

References

Sites of Special Scientific Interest in County Durham